Azmi Nassar (3 October 1957 – 26 March 2007) was a Palestinian football manager and served as manager of the Palestinian national football team.

Professional career

Palestinian National Team
In order to serve as manager of the Palestinian national football team, Nassar was required to obtain a Palestinian ID and passport to go. His ability to travel freely between the territories contributed to his success as national team coach.

Maccabi Ahi Nazareth
After guiding the club to the Israeli Premier League, Nassar resigned after the club was unsuccessful throughout the season and was replaced by Shiye Feigenbaum.

Personal life
A resident of Nazareth, Nassar was married to Ruthy, and they are followers of Christianity. Azmi's wife is technically Jewish and until her marriage to Azmi, when she was 18. Ruthy is the daughter of a mixed marriage between Ya'akov Kashlawi (an Arab Christian from Bir Zeit) and Rachel Cohen (a Jew from Petah Tikva).

References

1957 births
2007 deaths
Israeli Arab Christians
Palestinian footballers
Israeli footballers
Association football midfielders
Maccabi Ahi Nazareth F.C. players
Hapoel Haifa F.C. players
Maccabi Ironi Tamra F.C. players
Arab-Israeli footballers
Palestine national football team managers
Maccabi Ahi Nazareth F.C. managers
Bnei Sakhnin F.C. managers
Israeli football managers
Palestinian football managers
Footballers from Nazareth